Tonea may refer to several villages in Romania:

 Tonea, a village in Săsciori Commune, Alba County
 Tonea, a village in Modelu Commune, Călărași County